The Song of the Sannyasin is a poem of thirteen stanzas written by Swami Vivekananda. Vivekananda composed the poem in July 1895 when he was delivering a series of lectures to a groups of selected disciples at the Thousand Island Park, New York. In the poem he defined the ideals of Sannyasa or monastic life.

Background 
In the beginning of 1895, American disciples of Vivekananda requested him to organize a special session of lectures throughout the summer. Though Vivekananda was very tired at this time after multiple long sessions of public and private lectures, he assented. From mid-June to early August 1895, Vivekananda delivered a series of lectures to a group of selected disciples at the Thousand Island Park, New York.

In this period, sometime in July 1895 Vivekananda wrote The Song of the Sannyasin.

Theme 

In the poem, Vivekananda glorified Hindu concepts on Sannyasa and defined the ideals of monastic life. For centuries, it has been a tradition in India to revere Sannyasis and encourage people (especially the younger ones) to work for self-realization God realization. According to Hindu beliefs, Sannyasa is the best path of life one can take. In these 13 short poems, Vivekananda discusses the concept, beliefs and ideals of Sannyasa or monastic life.

Mohit Chakrabarti in his book Swami Vivekananda: A Poetic Visionary, called these poems as Vivekananda's religious introspection. Chakrabarti told— "Quite apart from the utilitarian and segmentary approach to religion more often than not prone to achieving a platform of materialistic superiority, the religion that Vivekananda highlights here is one of emancipation of man by means of sustained devotion to and involvement in knowledge, truth and freedom."

Stanzas 

 Read all 13 stanzas of The Song of the Sannyasin at Wikisource

Legacy 
According to Kalpana Mohapatra, The Song of the Sannyasin is the Bible of Bengal. This is also considered as a source of inspiration for Hindu monks, specially the monks of Ramakrishna Order find solace, inspiration and guidance from these poems. Satguru Sivaya Subramuniyaswami decided to renounce the world after reading this poem in his teenage.

References

Citations

Works cited 
 
 
 
 
 
 

1895 poems
Works by Swami Vivekananda
Philosophical poems